The Gaza Subdistrict was one of the subdistricts of Mandatory Palestine. It was situated in the southern Mediterranean coastline of the British Mandate of Palestine. After the 1948 Arab-Israeli War, the district disintegrated, with Israel controlling the northern and eastern portions while Egypt held control of the southern and central parts – which became the Gaza Strip, under Egyptian military between 1948 and 1967, Israeli military rule between 1967 and 2005, part of the Palestinian National Authority (with some aspects of retained Israeli rule until the 2005 withdrawal) after the Oslo Accords until 2007, and is currently ruled by the Hamas as a de facto separate entity from the Palestinian National Authority. The parts which Israel held since 1948 were merged into Israeli administrative districts, their connection with Gaza severed.

Borders
 Beersheba Subdistrict (Southeast)
 Ramle Subdistrict (Northeast)
 Hebron Subdistrict (East)
 Egypt (Southwest)

Localities

All of the localities captured by Israel were depopulated prior, during or after the 1948 War. al-Majdal was not destroyed.
Existing localities

 Abasan al-Kabera
 Abasan al-Saghira
 Bani Suheila
 al-Bayuk
 Beit Hanun
 Beit Lahia
 Deir al-Balah
 al-Fukhari
 Gaza City
 Jabalia
 Juhor ad-Dik
 Khan Yunis
 Khuza'a
 al-Mawasi
 Nuseirat
 Qa' al-Qurein
 al-Qarara
 Qizan an-Najjar
 Rafah
 Shokat as-Sufi
 Umm Kameil

Former localities

 Arab Suqrir
 Barbara
 Barqa
 al-Batani al-Gharbi
 al-Batani al-Sharqi
 Bayt Daras
 Bayt 'Affa
 Bayt Jirja
 Bayt Tima
 Bil'in
 Burayr
 Dayr Sunayd
 Dimra
 al-Faluja
 Hamama
 Hatta
 Hiribya
 Huj
 Hulayqat
 Ibdis
 Iraq al-Manshiyya
 Iraq Suwaydan
 Isdud
 al-Jaladiyya
 al-Jiyya
 Julis
 al-Jura
 Jusayr
 Karatiyya
 Kawfakha
 Kawkaba
 al-Khisas 
 al-Masmiyya al-Kabira
 al-Masmiyya al-Saghira
 al-Muharraqa
 Najd
 Ni'ilya
 Qastina
 al-Sawafir al-Gharbiyya
 al-Sawafir al-Shamaliyya
 al-Sawafir al-Sharqiyya
 Simsim
 Summil
 Tall al-Turmus
 Yasur

See also
 Gaza Sanjak
 Districts of Mandatory Palestine
 Gaza Governorate
 Southern District (Israel)

External links
 Gaza District Towns Palestine Remembered.
 Small Area Populations Palestinian Central Bureau of Statistics.

Subdistricts of Mandatory Palestine
History of the Gaza Strip
Geography of the Gaza Strip